The Sagay massacre occurred when a group of gunmen shot and killed nine sugarcane farmers, including four women and two children, while they were eating dinner in a makeshift tent on a farm in Sagay, Negros Occidental, on October 20, 2018. The farmers were members of the National Federation of Sugar Workers (NFSW), and the massacre may have been motivated by ongoing conflicts over land reform in the Philippines.

The massacre was part of a series of killings carried out in the Negros provinces against labelled Communists and their sympathizers, and follows the similarly motivated Escalante massacre of 1985.

Background 

There are 424,130 hectares of sugar lands in Negros Island. As of September 2016, more than 95,000 hectares have yet to be distributed under the country's land reform program.

Since 2009, farm workers in the region have been occupying agricultural lands and taking part in an annual practice called bungkalan (collective farming of food crops) for their subsistence.

From 2017 to 2018, 26 bungkalan farmers and organizers from the region became victims of extrajudicial killings. The victims killed in Hacienda Nene in Sagay City were part of the bungkalan campaign to till idle lands for survival.

Massacre 
Armed men reportedly attacked a makeshift tent in the sugarcane farm in Hacienda Nene, Purok Fire Tree, Barangay Bulanon, on October 20, 2018, and began shooting, killing nine farmers. Three of the victims were also burned after they were killed. According to Police Superintendent Joem Malong, the incident took place at 9:45 PM (GMT+8). The shooting lasted for 10 minutes.

Investigation 
After the incident, the police named the victims of the shooting, who included three men, four women and two children. According to the police, most of the victims were the members of Negros Federation of Sugar Workers. Police said that they were hunting for the killers. The NFSW said that the incident occurred on the first night of "bungkalan" activity — "wherein farmers occupy idle lands and collectively cultivate to make them productive." The police are investigating "land conflict" as the possible motive. In an interview on CNN Philippines, Sagay City Acting Chief of Police Chief Inspector Robert Mansueto said that the victims formerly farmed the land in question, and he added that "those killed were land reform beneficiaries." Initial reports said that 40 armed men took the place, but Mansueto clarified that it was five or six gunmen. Mansueto also said that the victims were eating dinner inside their tent before the incident. According to one survivor, the armed men arrived at the hacienda on foot and because of the remoteness of the area, the farmers did not notice them.

Chief Supt. John Bulalacao, Western Visayas police director, said that some of the 40 farmers "were linked to the New People's Army (NPA)" and claimed that NFSW was a "legal front" of the NPA, which the NFSW denied. Bulalacao said they are also looking at the possibility of the landowner or other claimants hiring goons to get rid of farmer-occupants.

Chief Insp. Manseto said that the incident appeared to have been a shootout between the gunmen and some of the farmers, although none of the gunmen were harmed. On the Crime Laboratory, one of the slain farmers was holding a .38 caliber handgun, however, three survivors denied this, saying that none of the members have guns. Police found 12 empty bullet casings from a 5.56 mm rifle and seven bullet casings from .45 caliber handgun.

In an interview on DZMM, Philippine National Police (PNP) Chief Oscar Albayalde said the NFSW is "used by the Communist Party of the Philippines to take over private lands for profit" and he added that the victims are "not legitimate tillers or tenants" of the plantation. The Department of Agrarian Reform said that the victims were "not beneficiaries of the government's land distribution program."

On October 23, the police said that they had identified one of the members of the NPA who is allegedly behind the massacre. According to the Armed Forces of the Philippines (AFP), the plantation where the incident took place was a "vigorous" place for the NPA.

Suspects 
On October 28, the PNP has identified Rene Manlangit and Rogelio Arquillo – recruiters of the farmers to the NFSW. The two were being filed murder charges by the police; however, the two suspects remain at large.

Reactions 
On October 21, Malacañang Palace condemned the incident, calling the incident an "extremely cruel act". Former Special Assistant to the President and now-senatorial candidate Bong Go announced that President Rodrigo Duterte will visit the wake of the slain farmers. However, due to poor weather conditions, his visit has been called off.

Several opposition figures condemned the incident and directly blamed Duterte for the act; former Bayan Muna Representative Neri Colmenares said that the Duterte administration and the Armed Forces of the Philippines (AFP) "should be held responsible" for the killing of nine farmers. Defense Secretary Delfin Lorenzana accused Colmenares of having political motivations for criticizing the government for the incident. Lorenzana also made a statement condemning the incident.
Anakbayan Cebu wrote on Twitter, saying that "vehemently condemns the fascist and terrorist acts of the Duterte regime towards the tillers of the land who are constantly victimized by his ferocious all-out war." The Commission on Human Rights (CHR) also condemned the killings and called on the government "to give assurance that justice would be served for the victims."

Bayan Muna Representative Carlos Zarate labelled the incident as part of the "real Red October" plot, which originally referred to an alleged plot to overthrow President Duterte. Women's group Gabriela Representative said that "this is a war against the people and a war against the poor." On October 21, a resolution titled "House Resolution No. 2262" was filed by ACT Teachers Reps. Antonio Tinio and France Castro, Bayan Muna Rep. Carlos Zarate, Gabriela Reps. Emmi de Jesus and Arlene Brosas, Anakpawis Rep. Ariel Casilao, and Kabataan Rep. Sarah Elago, calling for the House committees to conduct an investigation on the incident. According to the Unyon ng mga Manggagawa sa Agrikultura (UMA) and the NFSW, the massacre brought a total of 45 farmers killed in Negros island alone under the presidency of Duterte. Senator Risa Hontiveros also pointed the finger to Duterte, saying that the killing occurred "under his watch". Former solicitor general Florin Hilbay said that the government should give justice for the farmers "who only desire to own the land".

Netizens took part on their social media, decried the killings, and called for justice for the slain farmers.

On October 22, militant groups gathered at Camp Aguinaldo; the group believed that the effect of the killing of the farmers is the "militarization".

On October 23, Carlos Conde of Human Rights Watch made a statement, calling on the Duterte administration "to carry out a credible and impartial investigation" and he added that abuses of human rights in the Philippines are "not limited" to Duterte's drug war.

On October 25, relatives of the victims and other militant groups gathered at Taft Avenue in Manila to protests the killings of the farmers and decried the low wages and the government's failure of giving the land reform to the workers.

Aftermath 
On October 24, according to the NFSW via Facebook, a minor and key witness who survived the massacre was illegally
arrested by the Sagay authorities. After the news broke out, the authorities afterwards claimed that they intended for the minor to be turned over to his grandparents after being held in the Department of Social Welfare and Development custody. Former Bayan Muna representative Neri Colmenares, via Twitter, called for the immediate release of the minor.

On October 29, President Rodrigo Duterte told state forces to arrest groups occupying idle lands and to shoot those who resist violently.

On October 31, one of the victim's relatives blamed the supposed recruiter of the NFSW, Rene Manlangit, who promised to them that they "would have a parcel of land" if they joined the NFSW.

References 

2018 murders in the Philippines
History of Negros Occidental
Mass murder in 2018
Massacres in the Philippines
October 2018 crimes in Asia
October 2018 events in the Philippines